Olympique Lyonnais won Ligue 1 season 2003–04 of the French Association Football League with 79 points.

Participating teams 

 AC Ajaccio
 Auxerre
 Bastia
 Bordeaux
 Guingamp
 Le Mans
 Lens
 Lille
 Lyon
 Marseille
 Metz
 Monaco
 Montpellier
 Nantes
 Nice
 Paris Saint-Germain
 Rennes
 Sochaux
 Strasbourg
 Toulouse

League table

Results

Top goalscorers

Player of the Month

References

External links
France 2003/04 at Rec.Sport.Soccer Statistics Foundation

Ligue 1 seasons
France
1